David C. Funder (Ph.D., Stanford University 1979) is a personality psychologist and psychology professor in the Psychology department at the University of California, Riverside. He has written a number of important textbooks and research articles pertaining to the field of personality psychology.   He used to be a past editor of the Journal of Research in Personality, as well as being a former secondary editor of the Journal of Personality and Social Psychology. Funder has been praised for his studies on personality judgment. He had also published research over the attribution theory and the "delay of gratification".

Research

Researching personality judgment
Funder has worked with professor Maynard C. Krueger researching over personality judgments. Their work consisted of trying to decipher which variables and factors result in either accurate or inaccurate personality judgments made from psychologists and "every day people". The experiment of their research consisted of the two professors retrieving self analyzed information about the patients, judgments created from close acquaintances of the patients, and also recordings of the subject's behaviour using taped cameras. This research led to the understanding that: a "good judge", a "good target", a "good trait", and "good information" will lead to a more accurate personal judgement. Much of this research follows a Q-sort paradigm. The Riverside Accuracy Project describes the Riverside situation Q-sort and the Riverside behavioral Q-sort.

Researching the "delay of gratification"
Funder has also experimented in the area of an idea known as the "delay of gratification". Funder had performed this experiment with Daryl Bem.  To research this idea the two psychologists gathered up a group of children and their parents for a study. The parents were first asked to give personality explanations of their children. Their children were then put into a room sitting in a chair with a bell in front of it. Next, the children were shown two pieces of candy, one being very appetizing and loved by the child, and the second piece of candy given to the child was less liked. The child was then told that if he or she rang the bell an adult will automatically enter the room presenting the candy of less desire, but if he or she waited for someone to come into the room the child would be rewarded with their candy of choice. During this experiment, the personalities of the children willing to wait the longest time for the candy contained an element of being mostly well mannered, obedient, and helpful, but not special and smart. The experiment helped lead Funder to understand that what he actually was testing was the child’s ability to cooperate with adults, not the child's ability to delay gratification.

Textbooks authored by David C. Funder
 Funder, D.C.  (2019).  The Personality Puzzle  8th edition  New York: Norton
 Funder, D.C.  (2016).  The Personality Puzzle  7th edition  New York: Norton
 Funder, D.C.  (2012).  The Personality Puzzle  6th edition  New York: Norton
 Funder, D.C.  (2010).  The Personality Puzzle  5th edition  New York: Norton
 Funder, D.C.  (2007).  The Personality Puzzle  4th edition  New York: Norton
 Funder, D.C.  (2001).  The Personality Puzzle  3rd edition  New York: Norton
 Funder, D.C.  (2001).  The Personality Puzzle  2nd edition  New York: Norton
 Funder, D.C.  (1999).  Personality judgment: A realistic approach to person perception  San Diego, CA: Academic Press
 Funder, D.C.  (1995).  On the accuracy of personality judgement:  A realistic approach  Psychological Review, 102, 652–670
 Funder, D.C., Parke, R., Tomlinson-Keasey, C., & Widaman, K.  (Eds.)  (1993).  Studying lives through time:  Approaches to personality and development.  Washington, DC: American Psychological Association
 Funder, D.C., & West, S.G. (Eds.) (1993)  Consensus, self-other agreement, and accuracy in personality judgment:  An introduction  Journal of Personality, 64, 457–476
 Funder, D.C.  (1991).  Global traits: A neo-Allportian  approach to personality. Psychological Science, 2, 31–39
 Funder, D.C.  (1987).  Errors and mistakes: Evaluating the accuracy of social judgment.   Psychological Bulletin, 101, 75–90.
 Funder, D.C.  (1966).  The Arden American.  1st edition  Sacramento, CA: The Funderbolt News Service.

Brief contents of The Personality Puzzle Fourth Edition
The Personality Puzzle Fourth Edition is a personality psychology textbook written by Funder. The Personality Puzzle concentrates on six fundamental regions of personality psychology, and covers significant and classic theories of personality throughout the book. It also includes cartoons and illustrations to aid the readers visualize and understand the concepts. The brief content of this textbook is composed of six parts that serve as the main ideas summarizing the generalization of each of the 19 chapters. But the first chapter of the "contents in brief" is used by Funder as an introduction to the read.

Part I of Funder's "contents in brief" is titled "Research Methods"(pg. 17), which includes chapters two and three.  Chapter two(pg. 21) is titled: "Clues to Personality: The Basic Sources of Data", which chapter three (pg. 53) is titled "Personality Psychology as Science: Research Methods".

Part II of the "Contents in Brief" of the textbook The Personality Puzzle Fourth Edition is titled "How People differ:  The Trait Approach" (pg. 93).  Part II consists of chapters four through seven. Chapter four (pg. 95) in the "Contents in Brief" is titled "Personality Traits and Behaviour".  "Personality Assessment I: Personality Testing and Its Consequences" consist of the title to chapter five (pg. 122) in the "Contents in Brief". Chapter six is titled "Personality Assessment II: Personality Judgments in Daily Life".

Part III is titled "The Mind and the Body: Biological approaches to Personality" (pg. 221). Chapter eight (pg. 225) of this textbooks is titled "The Anatomy and Physiology of Personality" inside the "Contents in Brief". Chapter nine (pg. 266) is titled "The inheritance of Personality Traits to Understand Behaviour".

Part IV is titled "The Hidden World of the Mind: the Psychoanalytical Approach". This part consists of:  chapter ten (pg. 311), chapter eleven (pg. 343), and chapter twelve (pg. 373). "Basics of Psychoanalysis" is the title of chapter ten in the "Contents in Brief". And chapter eleven is named "The Workings of the unconscious mind: Defence and Slips". Finally, Part IV of the "Contents in Brief" concludes with the chapter twelve heading "Psychoanalysis after Freud: Neo-Freudians', Object Relations, and Current Research".

In the "Contents in Brief" of Funder's personality text book, Part V is dubbed "Experience and Awareness: Humanistic and Cross-Cultural Psychology". Chapter Thirteen (pg. 403) is titled "Experience, Existence, and the Meaning of Life: Humanistic Psychology". Chapter fourteen, which concludes Part V, is titled "Cultural Variation in Experience, Behaviour and Personality".

Finally, Funder's part VI of the "Contents in Brief" consists of chapters fifteen through nineteen. Chapter fifteen is titled "Learning to Be a Person: Behaviourism And Social Learning Theories". "Personality Processes: Perception, Thought, Motivation, and Emotion" conclude with the title to chapter sixteen of the "Contents in Brief" seen in The Personality Puzzle Fourth Edition, written by David C. Funder. Dr. Funder has given chapter seventeen the title of "What You Know about You: the Self. Chapter eighteen's title is headed "Disorders of Personality". And finally, the nineteenth chapter is titled "Conclusions: Looking back and Looking Ahead".

See also
 Differential psychology
 Human variability
 Personality

References

20th-century American psychologists
Personality psychologists
Living people
Year of birth missing (living people)
21st-century American psychologists
American textbook writers
University of California, Riverside faculty
Stanford University alumni